Riley Paul Woodcock is an Australian professional football (soccer) player who currently plays as a left back for Sydney Olympic in the NSW Premier League.

Early career 
Woodcock advanced through the youth setup at Cockburn City SC, the Australian Institute of Sport and Perth Glory FC.

Senior career

Sydney FC
After getting limited game time at Perth despite consistently being selected for and captaining Australian youth squads, Woodcock opted to join fellow Western Australian Brandon O'Neill and switch to the eastern seaboard, both signing with Sydney FC for the 2015–16 A-League season. After 6 appearances in all tournaments over the season, Woodcock was released from Sydney FC as part of their rebuild.

Despite being released by Sydney FC, Woodcock played the 2nd half of a pre-season friendly against Adelaide United. Days before the start of the 2016–17 A-League season, it was announced that he had re-signed on a one-year deal.

In February 2017, Woodcock was released by Sydney FC to pursue other career options. Riley signed with Sydney United for the 2017 NSW Premier League season.
In September 2017, Riley signed with NSW Premier League club Sydney Olympic for the 2018 season.

Career statistics

Club

References

External links
 

1995 births
Living people
Australian soccer players
Association football defenders
Perth Glory FC players
Sydney FC players
Sydney United 58 FC players
National Premier Leagues players
Australian Institute of Sport soccer players